Sayh is the name of a settlement in the Omani exclave of Musandam.

References

Musandam Governorate
Populated places in Oman